Salmon is a range of pinkish-orange to light pink colors, named after the color of salmon flesh.

The first recorded use of salmon as a color name in English was in 1776.

The actual color of salmon flesh varies from almost white to light orange, depending on their levels of the carotenoid astaxanthin due to how rich a diet of krill and shrimp the fish feeds on; salmon raised on fish farms are given non-synthetic or artificial coloring in their food.



Variations of salmon

Light salmon resembles the color salmon, but is lighter, not to be confused with dark salmon, which resembles salmon pink but is darker.

Salmon pink (or salmon in Crayola crayons) was introduced by Crayola in 1949. See the List of Crayola crayon colors.

Dark salmon resembles the color salmon, but is darker. Like the web colors light salmon and salmon shown above, it is used in HTML and CSS.

Terra cotta is a color that resembles terracotta pottery.

See also 
 List of colors

References

Shades of orange